The Hanford Engineer Works was a nuclear production complex established by the United States federal government in 1943 as part of the Manhattan Project during World War II. The site, located at the Hanford Site on the Columbia River in Benton County, Washington, was home to the B Reactor, the first full-scale plutonium production reactor. Plutonium manufactured at the site was used in the first atomic bomb in the Trinity test, and in the Fat Man bomb that was used in the atomic bombing of Nagasaki in August 1945. It was commanded by Colonel Franklin T. Matthias until January 1946, and then by Colonel Frederick J. Clarke.

Plutonium was a rare element that had only recently been isolated in the laboratory, but it was theorized that it could be produced by the irradiation of uranium in a nuclear reactor and used in an atomic bomb. The director of the Manhattan Project, Brigadier General Leslie R. Groves Jr., engaged DuPont to be the prime contractor for the design, construction and operation of the plutonium production complex. DuPont recommended that it be located far away from densely populated areas, and a site, codenamed Site W, was chosen on the Columbia River in the US state of Washington. The federal government acquired the land under its war powers authority and relocated some 1,500 nearby residents. The acquisition of 4,218 tracts of land totaling  was one of the largest in US history. Disputes arose with farmers over the value of the land and compensation for crops that had already been planted. Where schedules allowed, the Army allowed the crops to be harvested. The land acquisition process dragged on and was not completed before the end of the Manhattan Project in December 1946.

Construction commenced in March 1943 and immediately launched a massive and technically challenging construction project. Most of the construction workforce, which reached a peak of nearly 45,000 in June 1944, lived in a temporary construction camp near the old Hanford townsite. Administrators, engineers and operating personnel lived in the government town established at Richland, which had a wartime peak population of 17,000. The Hanford Engineer Works erected 554 buildings, including three nuclear reactors (B, D and F). The reactors were graphite moderated and water cooled, and operated at 250 megawatts. They were penetrated horizontally by 2,004 tubes. Natural uranium sealed in aluminum cans (known as "slugs") was fed into them.

B Reactor went critical in September 1944 and after overcoming neutron poisoning produced its first plutonium in November. Radioactive wastes from the chemical separations process were stored in underground tanks. The first batch of plutonium was processed in the T plant between December 1944 and February 1945 and was delivered to the Manhattan Project's Los Alamos Laboratory. The identical D and F reactors came online in December 1944 and February 1945, respectively. The site suffered an outage on 10 March 1945 when a Japanese balloon bomb struck a high-tension power line. The Hanford Engineer Works built  of roads,  of railway, and four electrical substations. The total cost up to December 1946 was over $348million (equivalent to $billion in ).

Contractor selection
During World War II, the S-1 Section of the federal Office of Scientific Research and Development (OSRD) sponsored a research project on plutonium. Research was conducted by scientists at Columbia University, Princeton University, the University of Chicago and the University of California at Berkeley. Plutonium was a rare element that had only recently been synthesized in laboratories. It was theorized that plutonium was fissile and could be used in an atomic bomb. The United States government was concerned that Germany was developing a nuclear weapons program. The Metallurgical Laboratory physicists in Chicago worked on designing nuclear reactors ("piles") that could irradiate uranium and transmute it into plutonium. Meanwhile chemists investigated ways to chemically separate plutonium from uranium. The plutonium program became known as the X-10 project.

On 23 September 1942, Brigadier General Leslie R. Groves Jr. became the director of the Manhattan Project, as it came to be known. Stone & Webster had been engaged to carry out the construction program at the Clinton Engineer Works in Oak Ridge, Tennessee, but Groves appreciated that the task of designing, building and operating the Manhattan Project's facilities would be beyond the resources of a single firm. At the same time, he wanted to keep the number of major contractors down for security reasons. Groves was attracted to DuPont, a firm he had worked with in the past on the construction of plants to produce explosives. Unlike most American firms, DuPont designed, built and operated its own plants. It had the experience and the expertise to be the prime contractor for all aspects of the plutonium production complex. This would have the added benefit of not requiring the Manhattan District to coordinate the plutonium project, thereby reducing Groves's own workload.

Groves arranged a meeting with Willis F. Harrington and Charles Stine from DuPont on 31 October and briefed them on the Manhattan Project. He arranged for a party of DuPont chemists and engineers, including Stine, Elmer Bolton, Roger Williams, Thomas H. Chilton and Crawford Greenewalt, to visit the Metallurgical Laboratory in Chicago on 4 November. On 10 November, Groves, Colonel Kenneth Nichols (the deputy chief engineer of the Manhattan District), Arthur H. Compton (the director of the Metallurgical Laboratory) and Norman Hilberry (Compton's deputy) went to DuPont's corporate headquarters in Wilmington, Delaware, where they met with the company's executive committee. Groves gave the President of DuPont, Walter S. Carpenter Jr., assurances the President of the United States, Franklin Roosevelt, the Secretary of War, Henry L. Stimson, and the Chief of Staff of the United States Army, General George C. Marshall, regarded the Manhattan Project as being of the greatest importance to the war effort.

To avoid being labeled as merchants of death, as DuPont had been after World War I, the executive committee insisted that it should receive no payment. For legal reasons, a Cost Plus Fixed Fee contract was agreed upon, with a fee of one dollar. At Carpenter's request, OSRD Director Vannevar Bush took a letter to Roosevelt noting that the government was assuming all responsibility for the hazards involved in the project, and Roosevelt initialed it.

Site selection

This was in stark contrast to the attitude of the physicists at the Metallurgical Laboratory; Eugene Wigner famously claimed that the reactors could be built on the Potomac River. A catastrophic accident might result in loss of life and severe health effects. Groves was concerned that even a less deadly accident might disrupt vital war production, particularly of aluminum, and force the evacuation of the Manhattan Project's isotope separation plants. But spreading the facilities at Oak Ridge out more would require the purchase of more land. Moreover, the number of reactors that needed to be built was still uncertain; for planning purpose it was intended to build six reactors and four chemical separation plants. 

The ideal site was described by eight criteria:
A clean and abundant water supply (at least )
A large electric power supply (about 100,000 KW)
A "hazardous manufacturing area" of at least 
Space for laboratory facilities at least  from the nearest reactor or separations plant
The employees' village no less than  upwind of the plant
Ground that could bear heavy loads.

The most important of these criteria was the availability of electric power. The needs of war industries had created power shortages in many parts of the country, and using the Tennessee Valley Authority was ruled out because the Clinton Engineer Works was expected to use up all of its surplus power. This led to consideration of alternative sites in the Pacific Northwest and Southwest, where there was surplus electrical power. Between 18 and 31 December 1942, just twelve days after the Metallurgical Laboratory team led by Enrico Fermi started up Chicago Pile-1, the first nuclear reactor, a three-man survey party consisting of Lieutenant Colonel Franklin T. Matthias and DuPont engineers A. E. S. Hall and Gilbert P. Church inspected the most promising potential sites.

They looked at sites in the vicinity of Coeur d'Alene, Idaho, Hanford and Mansfield, Washington, the Deschutes and John Day River Valleys in Oregon and Pit River in California, and Blythe and Needles on the Colorado River in California. They wrote up their report on the plane back to Washington, DC. On 1 January 1943, Matthias called Groves from Portland, Oregon, and reported that the Hanford site was "far more favorable in virtually all respects than any other". The survey party noted an abundance of aggregate, which could be used to make concrete, and that the ground appeared firm enough to hold the weight of massive structures, an assessment that would be confirmed by Army and United States Geological Survey engineers. The survey party was particularly impressed by the presence of a high-voltage power line from Grand Coulee Dam to Bonneville Dam that ran through the site, with an electrical substation on its edge. Groves visited the site on 16 January 1943, and approved the selection. It was officially designated the Hanford Engineer Works, and the site codenamed "Site W".

Matthias had worked with Groves on their previous project, the construction of the Pentagon. Groves intended for Matthias to become his deputy, but on the advice of the chief engineer of the Manhattan District, Colonel James C. Marshall, Matthias became the Hanford Site area engineer. Gilbert Church became the field project manager of DuPont's construction team. Part of the reason for sending them together on the survey party was to verify that they could get along with each other. As area engineer, Matthias had an unusual degree of autonomy. Hanford's isolated location meant that communications were limited, so day-to-day reporting back to Manhattan District headquarters in Oak Ridge was impractical. The project enjoyed an AAA rating, which meant that it had the War Production Board's highest priority for procurement of raw materials and supplies.

DuPont created a TNX division within E. B. Yancey's explosives department under Roger Williams. Williams divided TNX into two subdivisions: a Technical Division headed by Greenewalt that worked with the Metallurgical Laboratory on design, and a Manufacturing Division under R. Monte Evans to supervise plant operations. Construction was the responsibility of DuPont's Engineering Department, whose head, E. G. Ackart, assigned responsibility for the plutonium project to his deputy Granville M. Read. Eventually, 90 percent of DuPont's engineering personnel and resources were devoted to the Manhattan Project.

Land acquisition
Stimson authorized the acquisition of the land on 8 February 1943. A Manhattan District project office opened in Prosser, Washington, on 22 February, and the Washington Title Insurance Company opened an office there to furnish title certificates. Federal Judge Lewis B. Schwellenbach issued an order of possession under the Second War Powers Act the following day, and the first tract was acquired on 10 March.

The Manhattan District's Real Estate Branch divided the land into five areas. Area A, at the center of the site would be the location of the project facilities. This land would be acquired outright, and for safety and security reasons all non-project personnel would be removed. Area B was the area surrounding Area A, which comprised a safety zone; this land would be leased, with the occupants subject to eviction at short notice. Area C was earmarked for the workers' village and would be leased or purchased. Area D was earmarked for production plants and would be purchased. Finally there were two parcels of land designed as Area E, which would be acquired only if necessary. In all, 4,218 tracts totaling  were to be acquired, making it one of the largest land acquisition projects in American history.

Most of the land (some 88 percent) was sagebrush, where eighteen to twenty thousand sheep grazed. About 11 percent was farmland, although not all was under cultivation. Farmers felt that they should be compensated for the value of the crops they had planted as well as for the land itself. Most of the appraisers from the Federal Land Bank were based in Seattle, Washington, or Portland, Oregon, and were unfamiliar with farming under irrigation. They found that the farms were small, mostly  in area, and the farm buildings used a lot of salvaged timber and scrap; lumber was scarce in the desert. The fruit trees were much shorter than they were accustomed to; short trees used less water, were easier to pick, and withstood the wind better. Crops like asparagus and mint were unfamiliar to them, and because they visited in winter, many fields looked fallow, and the farmers themselves were sometimes absent for the season, often working in the shipyards in Seattle. Some had been drafted into the Army and had left for the duration of the war but did not consider their land to be abandoned. There had not been many land sales in the area for comparison, and prices were poor during the Great Depression. Appraisals tended to be quite low.

Since construction plans had not yet been drawn up, and work on the site could not immediately commence, Groves saw no harm in postponing the taking of the physical possession of properties under cultivation to allow farmers to harvest the crops they had already planted. This reduced the hardship on the farmers, and avoided the wasting of food at a time when the nation was facing food shortages and the federal government was urging citizens to plant victory gardens. Harvest dates ranged from 1 April to 15 June for asparagus, 20 June to 15 August for apples, apricots, peaches and pears, 1 to 15 September for mint, and 1 October for grapes, so some farmers remained on their land longer than others. When the residents became a security hazard to the project, an order was issued on 5 July expelling them with two days' notice. Seven landowners refused to go, and Matthias had to arrange with the court for their eviction.

The harvest in the summer and fall of 1943 was exceptionally bountiful, and prices were high due to the war. This greatly increased the land prices that the government had to pay. It also promoted exaggerated ideas about the value of the land, leading to litigation. A particular problem was the irrigation districts: there were concerns about whether their assets would cover their debts, and the farmers had to pay off their share from the sale of their property. An appraisal on 7 August found that the bonds were adequately covered but until then many farmers refused to deal with the War Department. The irrigation districts provided a nucleus for organized opposition to the land acquisition project, and hired the law firm of Moulton & Powell to represent them and the veil of secrecy shrouding the Manhattan Project inevitably led to rumors about its activities. The biggest grievance was slow payment. On 18 June 1943, Matthias noted that only nineteen checks had been delivered for the two thousand transactions that had been completed.

Discontent over the acquisition was apparent in letters from Hanford site residents to the War and Justice Departments. Bush briefed Roosevelt on the acquisition but the Truman Committee began making inquiries. On 15 June, the committee sent letters to Carpenter and Julius H. Amberg, Stimson's special assistant, seeking an explanation of the factors governing the choice of the location, the estimated cost of the project, and the need for the acquisition of so much land. At a cabinet meeting on 17 June, Roosevelt asked Stimson whether the Manhattan Project would consider moving plutonium production to another site. That afternoon Groves reassured Stimson that there was no other site "where the work could be done so well". Stimson then went to see the chairman of the committee, Senator Harry S. Truman, who agreed to remove the Hanford site from the committee's investigations on the grounds of national security.

Between March and October 1943, settlements averaged 108 per month. The first condemnation trial began on 7 October. Trial juries were largely drawn from Yakima, where land productivity and prices were much greater, and they distrusted the Federal Land Bank appraisers. Under the usual procedure in Washington state, the juries visited the tracts under adjudication, and the appearance at the site of workers with DuPont identification badges generated rumors that the project had no military value and that government was using its power of eminent domain for the benefit of private enterprise. The juries were sympathetic to the claims of the landowners and the payments awarded were well in excess of the government appraisals.

From October 1943 until April 1944, the rate of settlements dropped to an average of seven per month. Groves became concerned that public attention generated by the trials and the inspection of tracts by juries where construction was now commencing might jeopardize project security. He arranged with Norman M. Littell, the assistant attorney general in charge of the Lands Division at the Justice Department, for additional flexibility in making adjustments to valuations to facilitate out of court settlement, and for the establishment of a second court and additional judges. Air conditioning was installed in the courtroom in Yakima to permit cases to be heard during the summer months.

Littell became convinced that the root of the problem was faulty appraisals, and on 13 October 1944, he appeared at the court in Yakima and asked Schwellenbach to put all condemnation trials on hold until the Justice Department could carry out reappraisals of the more than 700 tracts still awaiting settlement. The Under Secretary of War, Robert P. Patterson sent a strongly worded letter to Attorney General Francis Biddle. This brought to a head a long-standing dispute between Biddle and Littell over the administration of the Lands Division, and Biddle asked for Littell's resignation. When this was not forthcoming, he had Roosevelt remove Littell from office on 26 November. When the Manhattan Project ended on 31 December 1946, there were still 237 tracts remaining to be settled. In all,  was spent on land acquisition, including  deposited for future awards, and $30,000 allocated for estimated future deficiencies.

About 1,500 residents of Hanford, White Bluffs, and nearby settlements were relocated, as well as the Wanapum people, Confederated Tribes and Bands of the Yakima Nation, Confederated Tribes of the Umatilla Indian Reservation, and the Nez Perce Tribe. Native Americans were accustomed to fishing in the Columbia River near White Bluffs for two or three weeks in October. The fish they caught was dried and provided food for the winter. They rejected offers of an annual cash payment, and a deal was struck with Chief Johnny Buck allowing Buck and his two assistants to issue passes to fish at the site. This authority was revoked in 1944 for security reasons. Matthias gave assurances to the Native Americans that their graves would be treated with respect, but it would be 15 years before the Wanapum people were allowed access to mark the cemeteries. In 1997, elders were permitted to bring children and young adults onto the site once a year to learn about their sacred sites.

Township

Hanford

Matthias and Church met in Wilmington on 2 March 1943, and drew up an outline of the layout of the Hanford Engineer Works. Even the construction workforce could not be housed on site, because some plant operation would have to be carried out during startup testing. The Army and DuPont engineers decided to create two communities: a temporary constructions camp and a more substantial operating village. Rather than create temporary construction camps at each building site, there would be one large camp servicing all the sites.

Construction was expedited by locating them on the sites of existing villages, where they could take advantage of the buildings, roads and utility infrastructure already in place. The DuPont and Hanford Engineer Works engineers decided to locate the temporary construction camp on the site of the village of Hanford, which had a population of about 125. It was served by the Connell-Yakima state highway the Pasco-White Bluffs road, and a branch line of the Chicago, Milwaukee, St. Paul and Pacific Railroad. Electricity was available from the Pacific Power and Light Company substation, and water from local wells. Community facilities included stores, two fruit packing warehouses, a stock yard, a combined grade and high school, and a church. Groves inspected the site in March 1943.

Since DuPont and the Metallurgical Laboratory had yet to make much progress on the design of the reactors or the processing plants, it was not known how many construction workers would be required to build them. Town planning proceeded on the assumption that construction would require 25,000 to 28,000 workers, half of whom would live in the camp, but DuPont designed the camp to permit expansion. This proved to be wise; nearly twice that number of workers would ultimately be required, and the capacity of surrounding communities to absorb workers was limited. Three types of accommodation were provided in the camp: barracks, hutments and trailer parking. The first workers to arrive lived in 125 US Army pyramidal tents with wooden floors and sides while they erected the first barracks. Two types of barracks were erected: two-wing barracks for women and four-wing barracks for men. White and non-white people had separate barracks. Barracks construction commenced on 6 April 1943 and eventually 195 barracks were erected, the last of which were completed on 27 May 1944. There were 110 for white men, 21 for black men, 57 for white women and seven for black women. Not all were used for accommodation, and one white-women wing was turned over to the Women's Army Corps. The barracks could hold 29,216 workers.

As construction of the facilities got under way, Groves released construction workers working on barracks by purchasing hutments. These were simple, prefabricated plywood and Celotex dwellings capable of accommodating ten to twenty workers each. For heating, they had a wood- or coal-burning stove in each unit. In all, 820 double huts and 272 single huts were bought from the Pacific Huts company in Seattle. Erected between 27 February and 15 July 1944, they held 7,120 white men and 2,714 black men. Between them, the barracks and hutments held 39,050 workers. Many workers had their own trailers, taking their families with them from one wartime construction job to the next. Seven trailer camps were established, with 3,639 lots, of which all but 45 were occupied during the peak of construction work, and 12,008 people were living in them. 

In addition to accommodation, the Hanford camp contained other buildings and facilities. Mess halls and recreation halls were operated by the Olympic Commissary Company under subcontract to DuPont. The original grocery and clothing stores remained in operation, and DuPont leased other stores, the number of which gradually expanded over time, to private operators. The Hanford camp contained two garages and service stations, a laundry, a bank, a post office and a bus station. There was a hospital, churches, a library, and police and fire stations. Before the Manhattan District arrived, the school had about 65 students. When the fall term commenced on 14 September 1943, it had 560 students and 18 teachers. In the 1943–1944 school year there were 1,891 students and 38 teachers. This year was its last; the school closed on 13 February 1945.

The new airport had two runways, one aligned north–south and the other east-west. This enabled the airport to handle Air Transport Command aircraft carrying air express shipments. The airport's buildings consisted of two hangars and a hutment, and there were electrical fuel pumps.

With the completion of construction in February 1945, the camp population rapidly decreased in size. Administrative and service offices were relocated to Richland. For security and safety reasons, it was desirable to have non-operating personnel located outside the restricted area, so it was decided to demolish the Hanford construction camp, leaving only a residual camp for a thousand men in case emergency construction was required. The Area Engineer's office removed all electrical and mechanical equipment for re-use, but much of it was surplus to the needs of the Hanford Engineer Works and was either shipped to other Manhattan Project sites or disposed of. Demolition commenced in January 1946 and was expected to take twelve months. A maximum of 363 workers were employed.

Richland

Richland was chosen as the site for the operating village. The project engineers also considered Benton City, Washington. It was more suitable, but was not part of the area initially acquired, and for security reasons it was desirable to have the operating village inside the restricted area. The Manhattan District could have acquired the area but given the opposition to the land acquisition already in progress, they decided to use Richland, which was already being acquired, instead. The village had a population of about 250, but was surrounded by small farms, so the  site had a population of about 600. The citizens of Richland were given until 15 November 1943 to vacate their homes.

The village plan initially called for a village of 6,500 people, expandable up to 7,500, based on the assumption that 30 to 40 percent of the operating employees would live in the surrounding communities. The inability of those communities to absorb the numbers soon became apparent, and in September 1943 the size of Richland was set at 16,000. DuPont put the contract for building the village out to tender, and the contract was awarded to the lowest bidder, G. Albin Pehrson, on 16 March 1943. Pehrson opened an office at Pasco High School. He produced a series of standard house designs based on the Cape Cod and ranch-style house design fashions of the day. While the Hanford construction camp had a grid layout, the residential areas of Richland had curved streets and cul-de-sacs. Existing shade and fruit trees were retained where possible. Power lines ran behind the houses. Unlike Oak Ridge and Los Alamos, Richland was not surrounded by a high wire fence. Because it was open, Matthias asked DuPont to ensure that it was kept neat and tidy.

Pehrson accepted the need for speed and efficiency, but his vision of a model late-20th century community differed from that of Groves. Groves was, for example, opposed to the stores having display windows, which he felt would encourage window shopping and impulse buying; he wanted them to look like the utilitarian post exchanges on Army posts. In this, and in many other things, Pehrson ultimately had his way, because DuPont was his customer, not the Army. The result was a compromise between his vision and that of Groves, although closer to the former than the latter. Groves wanted the houses to be clustered close together, so the residents could walk to amenities, but Pehrson gave them spacious lots, so cars and buses were required. As the town grew in size, Pehrson was able to convince Groves to allow more shops, but in each case he had to provide data demonstrating that the establishment in question was appropriate for a village the size of Richland. The resulting compromise would handicap Richland for many years with inadequate sidewalks, stores and shops, no civic center, and roads that were too narrow.

It was hoped that the existing commercial establishments could be reused, and they were permitted to continue to trade after the acquisition but were found to be too small or too poorly located. Several were converted to other uses. Most of the new commercial establishments were completed by 15 February 1945. It was likewise hoped that the existing dwellings could be re-used, but many of them were in poor shape, and renovating them would have cost more than building new houses. By February 1945, only 25 of the original dwellings, known as tract houses, were in use.

Some 1,800 prefabricated houses were added to the plan. The company responsible for their manufacture, Prefabricated Engineering, did not have the equipment to transport them to Richland from its plant in Toledo, Oregon, so it hired a Chicago-based firm to do this. The subcontractor ran afoul of wartime regulations requiring the company to hire local drivers, and the International Brotherhood of Teamsters, who cited safety issues. Matthias arranged for the prefabricated houses to be delivered by rail, which cost more. He negotiated a settlement with the union in April 1944, but the Office of Defense Transportation and the Interstate Commerce Commission were another matter, and Prefabricated Engineering was forced to hire a more expensive local firm. By the time the last of the prefabricated houses was ordered in May 1944, most of the available sites were gone, and prefabricated houses were clustered together on the western side of Richland.

Hiring a removalist to move possessions was difficult in wartime, the dwellings, including the prefabricated houses, were provided with basic furnishings, including a refrigerator, an electric stove, and an electric hot water system. In addition to houses, there were also 25 dormitories, eight for men and seventeen for women. The first nineteen built had single and double rooms, but the last six had only double rooms. These provided accommodation for up to 1,000 people.

Housing assignments were based on the employee's rank. At the time three-bedroom houses were considered a luxury, and Groves wanted two-bedroom houses; but DuPont argued that a quarter of the employees would be administrators or technical staff, who warranted larger homes. Groves was appalled at the idea of clustering houses of a certain value together, so employees of a certain ranks would live together in the same neighborhood. To Groves this was an overt assertion of social class in the United States, but DuPont had its way and the best houses were built on the most desirable lots along the river front for executives.

The population of Richland increased spectacularly once operating personnel began arriving in January 1944, reaching a peak of 17,000 in the middle of the year when construction and startup overlapped. It then declined to 15,000 by the end of the year as the construction workers departed. Before the acquisition Richland had an elementary school for 320 students and a high school for 100 students. An additional 16-room elementary school was authorized on 16 March 1943, then a third, and a fourth. The original high school was used in the 1943–1944 school year, but was found to be too small, so a new one was authorized in July 1943, and an extension to it in 1944. The four elementary schools and the high school had facilities for 1,900 students.

Electricity was drawn from the Pacific Power and Light Company's 66 kilovolt line. Two 5,000-kilowatt and one 10,000-kilowatt substation were built. The central portion of Richland had streetlights but in the outlying parts lighting was provided only at intersections. The streets were paved with asphalt-bound macadam. A garbage collection was organized. Water was drawn from wells rather than pumping from the Columbia River, although a pump house was designed. The wells were fed into a  reservoir. The water table began to drop alarmingly, and fields around Richland were flooded with water from the irrigation system to maintain it.

Personnel

The Manhattan District and DuPont set about recruiting a sizeable construction workforce with the help of the United States Employment Service and the War Manpower Commission. DuPont advertised for workers in newspapers for an unspecified "war construction project" in southeastern Washington, offering "attractive scale of wages" and living facilities. Daily rates were much higher than elsewhere: at Hanford unskilled laborers earned an average of $8 a day when $3 to $4 was usual elsewhere in the nation. Skilled pipefitters and electricians earned $15 a day when $10 was normal. Overtime could drive the pay still higher. The Hanford Engineer Works had high standards. Those hired as welders had to present work records and job references dating back fifteen years and then pass a test that eliminated 80 percent of applicants. Defective welds could not be tolerated, for once the reactors became operational, their  of welded joints would be inaccessible.

The construction workforce reached a peak of 45,096 on 21 June 1944. About thirteen percent were women, and non-whites made up 16.45 percent. African-Americans lived in segregated quarters, and had their own messes and recreation areas. They were paid less than white workers. Although DuPont agreed to hire African-Americans as construction workers, it had no intention of hiring them as operating personnel. These workers were all white and most were Protestant; fifteen percent were Catholic and ten were Jewish. Not all the 1,532 operating personnel had worked for DuPont before, but most came from its ordnance plants in Colorado, Illinois, Tennessee and Utah, where production had been scaled back or halted during 1943. Some were given special training at Oak Ridge or the Metallurgical Laboratory. More than half of them were over the maximum draft age of 38, and three-quarters of the 3,705 men aged 18 to 26 in the construction workforce were classified as 4-F by the Selective Service System, and were not required to serve because they did not meet the Army's minimum physical, mental, or moral standards. The Manhattan District arranged with local draft boards for exemptions for key personnel. The Selective Service Section of the area engineer's office handled 14,701 requests for exemption, and 50 percent were approved. These were forwarded to the local draft board with a letter signed by Matthias.

Recruiting workers was one problem; keeping them was another. Turnover was a serious problem. Groves was sufficiently concerned to mandate exit interviews. These revealed that the main causes of dissatisfaction among the workers were the isolated site, the poor working conditions and a sense that the work was not important to the war effort. The notion that the work was unimportant was generated by the secrecy surrounding the Manhattan Project, and a sense of impending victory in Europe towards the end of 1944 did not help either. When word got around that workers were leaving, other districts of the Corps of Engineers began poaching them. To make up for the shortfall in the number of workers, Matthias instituted a five-and-a-half-day and then a six-day work week. Workers worked a ten-hour day. An eight-week campaign against absenteeism among the construction workforce that commenced in November 1943 reduced the rate of absenteeism from 9.8 percent to 5.9 percent. Absenteeism hit an all-time low of 5.3 percent in September 1944.

Certain skills were in high demand. One was pipefitting; the reactors required water to cool them, and the chemical separation plants moved materials from stage to stage in pipes. In both cases, the work had to be of the highest quality, because once radioactive substances were introduced, it would be too dangerous to repair them. Arrangements were made with the International Association of Plumbers and Pipe Fitters that if any local chapter could make twenty or more pipefitters available for the Hanford Engineer Works, the Air Transport Command would fly them from their home state. In August 1944 the Manhattan District arranged for 198 skilled pipefitters to be furloughed from the Army to work on the project. Stimson specified that they be limited-service personnel not qualified for overseas service. They were transferred to the reserves and taken on by the piping subcontractor as civilians. The first of them arrived at the Hanford Engineer Works on 1 September.

After an industrial accident in which seven workers, including some pipefitters, died from being crushed when a tank being moved into position was dropped from a crane, the union asked for local representation on the site. Groves declined the request, but Matthias agreed to collect union dues from appropriate workers on behalf of the union. This did not keep the workers from striking, and there were a series of wildcat strikes and stoppages. Nonetheless, the industrial relations record of the Hanford Engineer Works was good. Of 126,265,662 man-hours worked by the construction workforce between December 1943 and December 1946, only 15,060 man-hours (0.011 percent) were lost due to stoppages, and 205 of these were disputes with management; the other 14,855 man-hours lost were due to jurisdictional disputes.

Another source of labor was prisoners. The Manhattan District arranged with Federal Prison Industries for crops to be harvested by prisoners from the McNeil Island Penitentiary. Most of the prisoners were conscientious objectors. A special camp was established for them with a capacity of 300; during the war it was almost always full. They weeded the fields, pruned the trees, picked the fruit and harvested the crops. They maintained irrigation ditches, fences and farm property. Crops harvested were used to supplement the prison diet, with surpluses sold. The number of prisoners employed dropped to 120 in 1946, because the end of the war had greatly reduced the number of incarcerated conscientious objectors, and using hardened criminals created discipline problems, leading to an end to the scheme.

Conditions at the Hanford Engineer Works undoubtedly were hazardous: workers had to deal with high voltages, toxic chemicals and radioactive substances. Nonetheless, between December 1943 and December 1946, 28,902,042 man-hours were worked by the non-construction workforce with 0.81 accidents per million hours worked, including one fatality, and a severity of 0.26, measured in days lost per thousand hours worked. This was well below the rates for accidents in industry at the time. In 1946, the Hanford Engineer Works won an award for 144 days straight without a workplace accident involving loss of time due to injury; it eventually went without one for 235 days.

The medical program at the Hanford Engineer Works was headed by William Dagett Norwood. He secured the services of Herbert M. Parker, a physicist from the Metallurgical Laboratory in Chicago, who became the health physicist. Norwood oversaw the construction of the Kadlec Hospital, which was staffed by civilians, and dealt with an outbreak of meningitis among the construction workers that resulted in two deaths. Workers in the production facilities wore film badge dosimeters and two small ionization chambers known as "pencils". The pencils were read and their results recorded on a daily basis; the dosimeters on a weekly one. Urine samples were taken to detect radioactive isotopes, particularly plutonium. Between January and August 1944 in the 200 area alone, more than a million pencils and 170,000 dosimeters were processed.

Facilities

The December 1942 layout of the Hanford Engineer Works provided for three reactors and two separation units, with the option to add another three reactors and a third separation unit.

Fabrication
The highest priority for construction was the Metal Fabrication and Testing (500) Area, for it contained facilities without which the others could not operate. Its 41 permanent buildings and 19 facilities included those for testing materials to be used in construction and operations, and for fabricating the uranium fuel elements used by the reactors. Only three or four of its buildings were urgently required though. Considerable difficulty was encountered in meeting the deadlines. The biggest problem was that the function of the Hanford Engineer Works was novel, and there was little previous experience on which to draw. Plans were subject to change during the construction process as more was learned. This was especially true of the laboratory testing areas.

They were then quenched in water and heated again in an argon atmosphere to prevent the formation of gas pockets or compounds of uranium and hydrogen. The initial charge of the three reactors required more than twenty thousand billets, and another two thousand were required each month.

It was the next step that caused the most problems. The uranium had to be protected from corrosion by the cooling water, and the cooling water from contamination by radioactive fission products. The ideal canning substance had a high resistance to corrosion by water, a low capacity for absorbing neutrons, and be capable of transmitting heat to the cooling water. This narrowed the choice of materials down to aluminum and aluminum-silicon alloy. Uranium was highly reactive with water, so the can had to be watertight. In fact, it had to be airtight to prevent gaseous fission products from escaping. And it had to be strong, for a burst can would not only release fission products, it could jam in the reactor, stop the flow of cooling water, and force a complete shutdown of the reactor.

DuPont investigated the problem at the Hanford Engineering Works, while the Metallurgical Laboratory studied it in Chicago. Uranium was so reactive that oxidation occurred no matter how quickly the canning process was applied. Several techniques were tried without success, as they failed to get the required exact fit. A contract was let for unbonded slugs in case no canning process could be found, but this was unnecessary. One evening DuPont's Raymond Grills and his assistant Ed Smith tried performing the canning operation in a bath of molten solder, which kept the oxygen away. They found that this created a uniform heating of the slug, and a snug fit of the aluminum can, although the heat melted a hole in it. The technique therefore involved dip coating the slug, first in a molten bath of 50–50 copper–tin alloy, then in one of aluminum-silicon alloy. The aluminum can was heated and chemically cleaned, and placed in a protective steel sleeve, and then in a press, with a small quantity of molten aluminum-silicon alloy added. The hot slug and aluminum cap were then pressed into the can at elevated temperature, displacing most of the molten aluminum-silicon alloy but leaving enough to fill any voids. The cap was then arc welded onto the can in an argon atmosphere.

Slug production commenced in June 1944 and by September enough canned slugs had been accumulated to commence loading the first reactor. This lifted the number of acceptable canned slugs from a few percent to more than 75 percent. In September, the hydraulic presses were abandoned in favor of a process in which the slugs, cans and tops were assembled manually in the solder bath. This increased the number of acceptable canned slugs to over ninety percent. The canned slugs were visually inspected for warps or defects. They were then subjected to the frost test. This involved cleaning the slug with carbon tetrachloride and sprayed with a nearly saturated solution of acenaphthene to produce a smooth white film on the surface. If there was a defect, the heat induced was above the  melting point of acenaphthene and it melted at the point of the defect. Less than one faulty slug was found for each 2,000 tested. Those found to be defective had their coatings dissolved using a mixture of caustic soda and sodium nitrate, followed by an immersion In hydrofluoric acid and a final wash with nitric acid.

Irradiation

Construction work on the reactors could not commence until Wilmington released the plans, which did not occur until 4 October 1943, but the engineers were aware that they were to be water cooled and run at 250 MW. Construction therefore commenced on the cooling water facilities in area 100-B on 27 August. Ninety-four percent of the heat was in the canned slugs, with most of the rest in the graphite moderator.

It was estimated that each reactor would require  and the three separation areas would require another  between them. This would normally be enough for a city of a million people. However, although the reactor could be shut down in two and a half seconds, it would continue to generate about one-fifth of the full-power heat due to the decay of fission products, which would diminish slowly. It was therefore vital that the flow of water should not cease. If the power failed, the steam pumps would automatically cut in and continue to deliver water at full capacity for long enough to allow an orderly shutdown.

Consideration was given to using groundwater, which would save the cost of building filtration plants, but tests indicated that the supply was inadequate even for one reactor. Water therefore had to be drawn from the Columbia River. Water intakes were designed to protect the fish. Facilities had to be provided to remove algae, solids, gases and dissolved minerals from the water. In the summer, the water would be too warm, so refrigeration was required. To save time, this was omitted from the first reactor to be built, B Reactor, which would initially operate during the winter months when the water required no refrigeration.

Helium was circulated through the reactors to provide an additional non-neutron absorbing coolant and a means of reducing the temperature differentials in parts of the reactor. Moisture was removed from the helium using silica gel and impurities removed by passing it through a charcoal filter. It entered the reactor through a duct in the floor and passed through the reactor via a horizontal manifold at the front, eventually being collected through a horizontal manifold at the rear.

The workmen set cast-iron blocks that would form the thermal shield, and the 726 laminated steel and masonite blocks, each weighing  that would form the biological shield on the front (charge) and rear (discharge). The steel absorbed gamma rays and provided structural strength. The wood, being rich in hydrogen, absorbed gamma rays and neutrons. The thermal shield also absorbed radiation, but its primary purpose was to prevent the concrete front disintegrating under neutron bombardment. It consisted of 15,000  cast-iron blocks, and was placed between the graphite and the biological shield.

The cast-iron base was then laid. This would be welded to the similar sections front, back and sides sections to completely encase the reactor and make it airtight. The front and rear faces contained 2004 holes for the aluminum tubes. In the Metallurgical Laboratory's original design there were 1,500 tubes arranged in a circle in the middle of the faces. DuPont's George Graves altered this to fill in the corners as well as a factor of safety, resulting in 2,004 holes. There were 29 holes in the top for vertical control rods, and nine in the sides for horizontal control rods. The front and discharge faces also contained 208 holes for the cooling water pipes. An elevator at the front supported a machine for emplacing the charges. The base was complete on 19 May.

Then came the graphite. Based on experience with the X-10 Graphite Reactor at the Clinton Engineer Works, the blocks were finished on site. An assembly-line process was used for this. Each block was carefully cleaned and numbered. Precision and cleanliness were emphasized; the workmen wore special uniforms and placed the graphite blocks with gloved hands. Each layer was vacuumed to remove dirt and dust. The last block was laid on 11 June, and the top shield was installed. The reactors contained no moving parts; the only sounds were those of the pumps.

Compton, Fermi, Greenewalt, Matthias, Williams and personnel from Wilmington and the Metallurgical Laboratory were on hand for the startup of B Reactor on 13 September 1944. That day the Operations Department accepted responsibility for the 100-B area from the Construction Department, including some minor work that was unfinished. Fermi inserted the first slug at 17:43. A chain reaction commenced with no cooling water in the reactor (dry critical) at 02:30 on 15 September with 400 tubes loaded. With water flowing through the pipes, wet critical was achieved at 17:30 on 18 September, with 834 tubes loaded. Production operations commenced in low power mode at 22:48 on 26 September. The power was increased to 9 megawatts, but after an hour the operators noticed that power had started dropping off and by 18:30 on 27 September the reactor had shut down completely. The following morning the reactor suddenly started up, but it shut down again when the power level was raised.

The possibility that there was coolant leak or a contaminant in the water was investigated, but no evidence was found. Suspicion then fell on there being an unknown neutron poison being generated as a fission product. Compton asked Walter Zinn to look for evidence in the Chicago Pile-3 reactor at Argonne and Richard L. Doan to investigate with the X-10 Graphite Reactor at the Clinton Engineer Works. Zinn found evidence. Fermi and Greenewalt independently determined that the culprit was Xenon-135. Although its neutron-absorbing properties70 times greater than any previously known isotopecame as a surprise, the possibility of a neutron poison being created had been considered. It was calculated that the reactor could operate at 14 megawatts with 1,000 tubes loaded, 94 megawatts with 1,600 tubes, and 216 megawatts with 2,004 tubes. This demonstrated the benefit of the extra tubes. It also helped that the reactor had nine control rods instead of just three, which permitted an orderly shutdown with the extra fuel.

Separation

The next phase in the production process was to separate the plutonium in the irradiated slugs from the uranium and fission products. The separation plants contained a separation building, where the separation would be conducted; a ventilation building for the disposal of radioactive gases; and a waste storage area for the disposal of solid and liquid wastes. In the original plan there was to be eight separation plants, but as a result of experience gained at the pilot plant at the Clinton Engineer Works this was reduced to four and then, in the summer of 1944, to three: T and U plants at 200-W and B plant at 200-E.

Priority for construction was accorded to facilities in the 300 and 100 areas, as they would be required first, and there was insufficient skilled labor to work on all the areas simultaneously. Little work was done on the 200 areas until January 1944. Although construction commenced on 26 June 1943, the work at 200-W was only three percent complete by the end of the year. The construction of the separation building, 221-T, was also affected by delays in delivery of critical equipment such as stainless steel pipe and the 10-ton crane. There were also some late design changes. The pace picked up in mid-1944, and 100-W was completed in December. Ground was broken in the 100-E area on 2 August 1943, but work was only six percent complete at the end of April 1944. It was completed in February 1945. Ground was broken at 200-N on 17 November 1943, and was completed in November 1944. T plant began processing irradiated slugs on 26 December 1944; B Plant followed on 13 April 1945. U plant never did, and was used as a training facility.

The quantity of plutonium in each canned slug was dependent on the time spent in the reactor, the position in the reactor, and the power level of the reactor. The history of each of the 70,000 slugs in each reactor was recorded and tracked with an automatic index card machine. Tubes could be selectively discharged. Discharge was effected simultaneously with recharging: as new slugs were inserted into the tube, the irradiated ones fell out the discharge side onto a neoprene mattress and then rolled into the water-filled discharge storage basin. The water was deep enough to shield the working area above from radiation. The slugs were sorted manually with long tongs and placed into buckets suspended from an overhead monorail system. The buckets were weighed, placed into lead-lined water-cooled casks and transported to the lag storage (200-N) area on a special railroad car operated by remote control. Each tank car carried two casks. Here, they were stored underwater to allow short-lived but highly-radioactive fission products to decay.

Inside, the buildings were canyons and galleries. The galleries contained piping and equipment. The canyons were divided into 22 sections in T plant and 20 in B plant. Each section contained two concrete cells. Once the canyons began processing irradiated slugs, the machinery would become so radioactive that it would be unsafe for humans ever to come in contact with it. The engineers had to devise methods to allow for the replacement of any component via remote control. They came up with a modular cell concept, which allowed major components to be removed and replaced by an operator sitting in a heavily shielded overhead crane.

Periscopes and closed-circuit television gave the crane operator a better view of the process. It was found that radiation blackened the glass lenses of the periscopes, so plastic ones were used instead. The operators generally preferred the periscopes, designed by the Metallurgical Laboratory and DuPont in Chicago and built by DuPont in Wilmington, to the closed-circuit television, as the picture quality of the latter was poor. Raymond Genereaux, the manager of the separation plants, had the operators assemble all the equipment inside by remote control as if the area was already radioactive.

A series of chemical processing steps separated the plutonium from the remaining uranium and the fission waste products. The slugs were dumped into a dissolver, covered with sodium nitrate solution and brought to a boil, followed by slow addition of sodium hydroxide. After removing the waste and washing the slugs, nitric acid was used to dissolve them. Bismuth nitrate and phosphoric acid were added, producing bismuth phosphate, which was precipitated carrying the plutonium with it. The precipitate was removed from the solution with a centrifuge and the liquid discharged as waste. This reduced the gamma radiation by 90 percent. The precipitate was placed in another tank and dissolved in nitric acid. Sodium bismuthate or potassium permanganate was added to oxidize the plutonium. The bismuth phosphate was precipitated, and the plutonium left behind in solution. This step was then repeated.

The plutonium-bearing solution now had 100,000-th of the original gamma radiation. It was transferred from the 221 buildings to the 224 Bulk Reduction buildings through underground pipes. Phosphoric acid was added, and the bismuth phosphate precipitated and removed. In the "crossover" step, a lanthanum fluoride process was used. Lanthanum salts and hydrogen fluoride were added, and lanthanum fluoride was precipitated, leaving the plutonium in solution. This removed lanthanides that bismuth phosphate process could not. The process was then repeated. This time potassium hydroxide was added to metathesize the solution. Liquid was removed with a centrifuge and the solid dissolved in nitric acid to form plutonium nitrate. The final step was carried out at the 231-Z Isolation building, where hydrogen peroxide, sulfates and ammonium nitrate were added to the solution and the plutonium precipitated. It was dissolved in nitric acid and put into shipping cans, which were boiled in hot air to produce a plutonium nitrate paste.

Radioactive wastes from the chemical separations process were deposited in tank farms consisting of 64 single-shell underground waste tanks (241-B, 241-C, 241-T, and 241-U).

Operations
On 19 July 1944, Charles A. Thomas informed Williams and Greenewalt that Robert Oppenheimer, the director of the Manhattan Project's Los Alamos Laboratory, had given up all hope of getting the Thin Man gun-type nuclear weapon to work. The Los Alamos Laboratory was now going to concentrate on the development of the Fat Man implosion-type nuclear weapon. A meeting with Groves and James B. Conant in Washington, DC, was arranged for 21 July. At this point, Reactor B was nearly complete, but Reactor D was several months behind it, and Reactor F was not even a quarter complete. If the Los Alamos Laboratory was somehow able to design and build a working implosion weapon in just a few months, then each bomb would require only a few kilograms of plutonium, and there might be no need for Reactor F. If not, then there would be no need for any of the reactors at all. Groves and Conant were not convinced that the figures they had were reliable enough to take such a drastic step as canceling Reactor F, and they suggested that Williams and Greenewalt discuss the issue with Fermi when they got back to Hanford. They did, and Fermi confirmed that an implosion-type weapon would indeed require much less plutonium.

The first batch of plutonium was refined in the 221-T plant between 26 December 1944 and 2 February 1945. Batches of plutonium nitrate were despatched in a small truck in twenty metal containers inside wooden boxes, escorted by two patrol cars. Matthias personally couriered it by train from Portland to Los Angeles, where he hand delivered it to the courier from the Los Alamos Laboratory. He chose to send it by road because he considered air was too risky and rail too slow. By 28 March, all three reactors were operating at full power, 250 megawatts, for the first time, and by April, trains containing kilogram-quantity shipments of plutonium were headed to Los Alamos every five days. Road convoys replaced the trains in May, and in late July shipments began being despatched by air from the airport at Hanford. The plutonium shipped to Los Alamos was at least 98 percent pure. The only complaint from Los Alamos was the presence of silica fibers left over from the filtration process; these were reduced as the production process was refined and fewer filtrations were required.

On 10 March 1945, a Japanese balloon bomb struck a high-tension line running between Grand Coulee and Bonneville. This caused an electrical surge in the lines to the reactors. A scram was automatically initiated and the safety devices shut the reactors down. The bomb failed to explode and the transmission line was not badly damaged. The Hanford Engineer Works was the only US nuclear facility to come under enemy attack.

At Oppenheimer's request, the Hanford Engineer Works also produced polonium-210. Greenewalt protested the diversion of plutonium production capacity to Compton, but to no avail; polonium was required for the neutron initiators, and concentrating all production at the X-10 Graphite Reactor at Oak Ridge would jeopardize the entire effort if there was a mishap there. On 1 May four tubes in D reactor were loaded with 264 slugs containing bismuth. The irradiated bismuth slugs were shipped to Los Alamos for processing. There was intense pressure in June and early July to produce more plutonium for the Trinity test on 16 July 1945, and in late July for operational use. Experiments were conducted in increasing the batch size. This was dangerous, as it was not known how much plutonium-bearing liquid could be safely handled without the risk of a criticality accident. Changes were made to procedures in July and August to minimize the risk. The length of the cooling period was cut to less than thirty days, and possibly as short as fifteen days.

Postwar

Throughout the war, the Manhattan Project maintained a top secret classification. Until news arrived of the atomic bombing of Hiroshima, fewer than one percent of Hanford's workers knew they were working on a nuclear weapons project. Groves noted that "We made certain that each member of the project thoroughly understood his part in the total effort; that, and nothing more." The words "uranium" and "plutonium" were forbidden; the former was "base metal" and the latter "product". Posters and cartoons featuring "Security Jane" and "Corporal Paddy" exhorted workers to avoid talking about the work they did.

The existence and purpose of Hanford was publicly revealed through press releases on 7 and 9 August 1945, after the bombing of Hiroshima but before Hanford plutonium in a Fat Man bomb was used in the bombing of Nagasaki on 9 August. Further details came with the publication of the Smyth Report on 12 August 1945. The general public was now informed about Hanford, although the report did not reveal many of the Hanford's secrets. Groves presented the Hanford Engineer Works with the Army-Navy "E" Award on 20 October 1945. He arranged for Senators Hugh Mitchell, Homer S. Ferguson and Harley M. Kilgore to be given a guided tour of the Hanford Engineer Works. They were the first civilians not directly connected with the Manhattan Project to enter a process building.

Matthias was succeeded as area engineer by Colonel Frederick J. Clarke in January 1946. DuPont would soon be gone too. The Manhattan District's original contract with DuPont was for the duration of the war plus six months thereafter. A supplemental agreement extended this to 30 June 1946, with an option to extend for a further year, which Groves exercised. Groves attempted to negotiate a long-term extension, but Carpenter declined. He agreed to remain until 31 October 1946, but he insisted that DuPont would walk away at that time. On 11 March 1946, Groves informed Patterson, who had succeeded Stimson as Secretary of War on 21 September 1945, that DuPont would have to be replaced. Because DuPont left before the term of the contract, the government asked for 33 cents of the one dollar fee back.

Groves's choice of replacement was General Electric. Its president, Charles Wilson, was initially reluctant, but on 28 May 1946 he accepted the assignment. The contract stipulated that General Electric would operate the Hanford Engineer Works, design and construct alterations and additions, and conduct research and development incidental to the work at Hanford. It allowed General Electric to withdraw unilaterally if legislation before Congress to create the Atomic Energy Commission was not to its liking. It also provided for the establishment of the Knolls Atomic Power Laboratory, a new government-owned laboratory where General Electric would conduct research and development. General Electric took over operations at Hanford on 1 September 1946, and accepted formal control on 30 September.

On 31 December 1946, the Manhattan Project ended and control of the Hanford site passed to the Atomic Energy Commission.

Notes

References

Further reading

External links
Dear Anne: a letter telling you all about "Life in Hanford" A 1944 pamphlet that explains the steps to be taken by new employees upon their arrival.
Here's Hanford A 1944 pamphlet that provides new employees with a detailed map and lists all the amenities to be found in the Hanford area.
Hanford A 1945 pictorial record that documents construction of the Hanford Engineer Works.
Hanford Trailer City and Environment. Public domain photos selected from the Hanford Declassified Project.
Building a Town. Public domain photos selected from the Hanford Declassified Project.

 
History of Washington (state)
History of the Manhattan Project
Manhattan Project sites
1943 establishments in Washington (state)